Seda or SEDA may refer to:

Acronyms
 Safe and Effective Drug Act, a bill proposed in the United States House of Representatives in 2004
 Seeing Eye Dogs Australia, an Australian organisation
 Staff and Educational Development Association, a professional association of university staff developers
 Staged event-driven architecture, an Internet server software architecture
 Standby Equity Distribution Agreement, a financing agreement

Music
 Seda (Foo Fighters song), by the Foo Fighters

Media
 Seda (magazine), published in Iran

People

Given name
 Seda Aznavour (born 1947), French-Armenian singer and artist
 Seda Nur İncik (born 2000), Turkish footballer
 Seda Melkonian (born 1963), Lebanese-Armenian activist and lecturer 
 Seda Sayan (born 1964), Turkish pop singer
 Seda Tokatlıoğlu (born 1986), Turkish volleyball player
 Seda Yörükler (born 1984), Turkish handballer
 Seda Tutkhalyan (born 1999), Russian artistic gymnast
 Seda Yıldız (born 1998), Turkish Paralympian goalball player

Surname
 Heriberto Seda (born 1967), American serial killer
 Jon Seda (born 1970), American actor
 Santos Seda, Puerto Rican politician

Places
 Seda, Lithuania, town
 Seda, Latvia, town
 Seda (river), in Latvia
 Seda County, or Sêrtar County, county in Sichuan, China

Other uses
Seda Hotels, a Philippine hotel chain